Yuleba South is a rural locality in the Maranoa Region, Queensland, Australia.

History 
The locality takesits name from the town of Yuleba, which was a name given in 1865 to a settlement on Yuleba Creek, but which in October 1879 was moved to the railway crossing on Yuleba Creek.

Road infrastructure
The Warrego Highway runs along part of the northern boundary.

References 

Maranoa Region
Localities in Queensland